Genesis HealthCare Corp. v. Symczyk, 569 U.S. 66 (2013), was a decision by the United States Supreme Court dealing with the justiciability doctrine of mootness.

Background

The Fair Labor Standards Act of 1938 (FLSA) provides that all employees have the right to full pay for forty hours of work in any given week. Laura Symczyk, a nurse working for Genesis HealthCare, alleged that her employer would regularly dock thirty minutes of pay per shift for its employees as meal time, regardless of whether the employee actually took a meal break. Under the FLSA, an aggrieved employee can sue not only on her own behalf, but on behalf of all co-workers who have similarly been injured. This is called a "collective action," which is roughly (but not completely) similar to a class action.

Symczyk filed a collective action suit under the FLSA, and her employer thereafter offered her $7,500 in unpaid wages plus attorneys fees and other costs and expenses, which would have fully satisfied her individual claim. After she failed to respond to the offer, Genesis moved to dismiss the suit, arguing that through her failure to accept satisfaction, in full, of her claim for relief, she no longer had any interest in the litigation. Symczyk argued that her employer was simply attempting a "pick off" - by satisfying her claim, Genesis could avoid facing the collective action suit on behalf of the other employees. The district court found that because no other employees had joined the collective action and because Symczyk had been offered full relief, her claim was moot. The United States Court of Appeals for the Third Circuit agreed that Symczyk's personal claim was moot, but authorized her to proceed with the collective action.

Decision

In a 5–4 decision, the Supreme Court held that the entire action must be dismissed based on an assumption of mootness. The majority did not actually settle the mootness issue, claiming that the issue was not properly before the Court because Symczyk failed to file her own appeal on the point and had waived the issue in the proceedings below. The majority held that a collective action suit cannot survive once the individual claim is satisfied without other workers coming forward to take part. Because Symczyk failed to contest that the offer from Genesis mooted the claim, and because no other workers had joined the collective action, the entire action was moot.

The dissent emphasized that this case is largely meaningless in the grand scheme of things because this situation would likely never recur in another case. The dissent attacked the majority's assumption that the offer of satisfaction mooted the claim, and the dissenters further argued that when such an offer is simply unaccepted (as was the case here) the case can continue to move forward.

References

External links
 

2013 in United States case law
United States Supreme Court cases
United States Supreme Court cases of the Roberts Court